Martina María Iñíguez de Monreal is an Argentine known for writing about the History of the tango. She wrote a biography of Carlos Gardel.

References 

1939 births
Living people
People from Corrientes
Argentine women writers